Laurens Hoekman (born 10 February 1998 in Zoetermeer, South Holland, Netherlands) is a Dutch curler. He currently plays second on the Dutch men's curling team skipped by Wouter Gösgens.

Teams

References

External links

2017 Spotlight on: Netherlands | Ford World Men’s Curling Championship | EYE OPENER – SUNDAY, APRIL 2, 2017 (page 7)
Video: 

Living people
1998 births
People from Zoetermeer
Dutch male curlers

Sportspeople from South Holland
21st-century Dutch people